Berry Berry Singles is an album by Nana Kitade, released in November 2007. It is her first compilation album, and it features the singles "Kesenai Tsumi", "Kiss or Kiss", and "Antoinette Blue", along with other songs for nine songs total. It also features three bonus tracks including a reworking of "Kesenai Tsumi" and "Alice" with former Megadeth guitarist Marty Friedman and a cover of Daisy Chainsaw's "Love Your Money". The limited edition includes a bonus DVD with documentary footage of Kitade's performance in Paris and an interview of her and Marty Friedman.

Track listing

Singles
"Antoinette Blue (September 5, 2007)

Nana Kitade albums
2006 albums